Edward Chandler Moore (August 30, 1827 – August 2, 1891) was a noted American silversmith, art collector, and benefactor of the Metropolitan Museum of Art.

Moore was born in New York City, where his father, John Chandler Moore, was a noted silversmith, and learned his craft in his father's shop. From 1848-1851 he was a partner in the business, and when his father retired, Moore inherited the business.  Moore was  a highly successful silversmith when he entered an exclusive contract with Tiffany & Co. under which he would work exclusively for Tiffany's as an independent, outside craftsman.  In 1868 he  joined the firm, working as the firm's chief silver designer until his death 1891.  Moore  made many improvements in manufacturing processes, adding flatware to Tiffany's silver catalog in 1869. 

He won a gold medal at the Exposition Universelle in 1867 for his exhibit of silverware, another medal at the Centennial Exposition in 1876, and a special gold medal in 1878 in Paris. In 1889 he was awarded the Legion of Honor. He died in his summer house at Hastings-on-Hudson, New York.

Moore amassed a notable collection of art, with a focus on art from Japan, the Islamic world and ancient Greece and Rome.   His collection contains somewhere between 1,600 and 1,700 pieces. He first began to study objects to help inform his designs, and subsequently began to collect them. At one time he devoted his attention to Japanese and Chinese porcelains, and later old Persian wares. Over time he became interested in old glass and lusterware porcelains which now form an especially rich part of the collection. His collection includes antique Roman, Cyprian, Etruscan, Merovingian, Venetian, Persian, Arab, German, and Spanish glass; Chinese, Japanese, Korean, Hispano-Moresque, Rhodian, Damascus, and Persian ceramics; Persian, Turkish, and Indian metalwork, including Saracenic metal work of the twelfth and thirteenth centuries, as well as Chinese and Japanese bronzes, swords and sword-guards; Japanese inro, netsuke, lacquer ware, and wood and ivory carvings; and Oriental jewelry, Persian lacquer, antique French and Venetian inlaid straw work, and a fine collection of Tanagra figurines.

He bequeathed many objects from his collection to New York's Metropolitan Museum of Art.

New York's Metropolitan Museum of Art, which will host an exhibit of Moore's work in 2020, describes Moore as "the creative force who led Tiffany & Co. to unparalleled originality and success during the second half of the nineteenth century."

References 

 "Moore, Edward Chandler", American National Biography.
 "Edward Chandler Moore", American Silversmiths.
 "The Edward C. Moore Collection", in The Collector, Vol. 3, No. 13, May 1, 1892, pages 199-201.
 "Edward C. Moore and Tiffany Islamic-Style Silver, c. 1867–1889", Elizabeth L. Kerr Fish, in Studies in the Decorative Arts, Vol. 6, No. 2, 1999, pages 42-63.
 The Great Chinese Art Transfer: How So Much of China's Art Came to America, Michael St. Clair, Rowman & Littlefield, 2016, pages 151-152.

1827 births
1891 deaths
American silversmiths
People from New York City
Tiffany & Co.